Seyed Reza Bahaadini (March 29, 1908 – July 19, 1997) was an Iranian Shia jurist, teacher of ethics and practical mysticism. He was one of the disciples of Abdul-Karim Haeri Yazdi, Seyyed Mohammad Hojjat Kooh Kamari, Seyyed Mohammad Taghi Khansari and Hossein Borujerdi. His greatest occupation and fame was his public or private debates on Islamic ethics courses, which lasted until the last days of his life.

Birth and lineage
Seyed Reza Bahaadini was born on 29 March 1908 in Qom, Iran. His lineage goes back to Ali ibn Husayn Zayn al-Abidin (the fourth Imam in Shiʻi Islam). His father, Seyed Safi al-Din, was a pious man and one of the servants of the Fatima Masumeh Shrine, he had Islamic seminary education and was fluent in Quranic studies. His mother, Fatemeh Soltan, was from the descendant of the family of Mulla Sadra (Persian Twelver Shi'i Islamic mystic and philosopher).

Education and career
From the age of two, he was sent to primary local school to learn the surahs of Quran. After learning to recite the Quran, he learned to read and write. At the age of six, he entered the Islamic Seminary of Qom, where he began to study religious sciences. He entered Feyziyeh School at the age of 12 after passing the entrance exam. Due to his rich and extraordinary intelligence, he was noticed by the professors from the very beginning and he started learning specialized topics under the supervision of professors such as Sheikh Abolghasem Qomi (died 1934) and Mohammad Taghi Bafghi (died 1946). He also passed the intermediate seminary courses with professors Mirza Mohammad Ali Adib Tehrani (died 1949), Mirza Mohammad Razini Hamedani (died 1999), Mullah Ali Masoumi Hamadani (died 1978) and Sadr al-Din al-Sadr (died 1953).

At the age of 19, he began the highest level of seminary courses such as Islamic jurisprudence and Principles of Islamic jurisprudence under Abdul-Karim Haeri Yazdi (died 1937), and after him, he benefited from the lessons of Seyyed Mohammad Hojjat Kooh Kamari (died 1953), Seyyed Mohammad Taghi Khansari (died 1952) and Hossein Borujerdi (died 1961). And since then, he first began to teaching general courses of literature, Islamic jurisprudence and principles for many years. After that, for nearly twenty years he has been teaching the highest level of seminary courses in the Islamic Seminary of Qom.

His disciples
Ayatollah Seyed Reza Bahaadini's greatest occupation throughout his life has been teaching Islamic seminary sciences. Many people have attended his lesson, some of whom are:
 The intermediate seminary courses

 Morteza Motahhari
 Ali Meshkini
 Ahmad Azari Qomi
 Mohammad Fazel Lankarani
 Hussein-Ali Montazeri
 Mostafa Khomeini
 Seyyed Abdollah Fateminia
 Seyyed Abolfazl Ahmadi Khomeini Shahri
 Seyyed Mohammad Hossein Hosseini Tehrani

 The highest level of seminary courses
 Mahdi Hadavi Tehrani
 Seyyed Mohammad Hashem Qazanfari Khansari
 Hossein Heydari Kashani
 Mohammad Hassan Ahmadi Faqih
 Mohammad Hossein Ahmadi Faqih Yazdi
 Mahmoud Amjad
 Ahmad Jannati
 Mohammad Hassan Moezzi
 Mohammad Momen
 Mohammad Nasiri

Bibliography
The following manuscripts and treatises by Seyed Reza Bahaadini remain (all in Persian language, the titles have been translated into English for convenience):

 Statements of the course of Hajj Sheikh Abdul-Karim Haeri Yazdi on Fiqh and principles, especially the discussion of Zakat
 Statements of the course of Agha Zia ol Din Araghi on topics outside of Fiqh
 Statements of the course of Mirza Muhammad Hossein Naini outside of Fiqh and principles
 Statements of the course of Ayatollah Borujerdi on advanced jurisprudential issues
 Notes on some cases from the book Riyad al-Masa'il
 Statements of the course of Muhammad Hujjat Kuh-Kamari
 Footnotes and comments on the book Al-Urwah al-Wuthqa by Mohammed Kazem Yazdi
 Notes on Makasib by Sheikh Ansari
 Comments and explanations on Kefayah al-osul by Akhund Khorasani
 An explanation of some phrases from Al-Sahifa al-Sajjadiyya
 Description of parts of Nahj al-Balagha, especially the first sermon and also the Imam's letter to Malik al-Ashtar
  Interpretive topics under the surahs of Asr, Inshirah, Nasr, Kawthar and a part of surahs Ankabut and Yusuf
 Description of the Supplication of Abu Hamza al-Thumali
 Studies in Arabic language and literature and a comparison between the order and prose of Jahiliyyah with the era of the advent of Islam
 Notes about Fiqh and its principles
 Reflection on the thoughts and ideas of the Wahhabi sect
 Collection of poems

None of the scattered writings that Seyed Reza Bahaadini has written about Nahj al-Balagha, exegesis of the Quran and his notes on the jurisprudential interpretations of some of his masters have not been widely published. However, some of his ethics courses and some of his interviews have been published in two following books:

 Spiritual Conduct: Speeches, Interviews, and Memoirs of the Pious Faqih and the Wise Mystic Ayatollah Bahaadini, compiled by Akbar Asadi
 The Ladder to Sky: A Collection of Ethics Courses of the Pious Faqih and the Wise Mystic, excellency Ayatollah Bahaadini, compiled by Akbar Asadi

Marriage and children
Seyed Reza Bahaadini got married at the age of seventeen. He had two sons and eight daughters.

Death
Seyed Reza Bahaadini died on 19 July 1997 in Qom and was buried in the Fatima Masumeh Shrine next to the grave of his teacher Abdul-Karim Haeri Yazdi. One day after the death of Seyed Reza Bahaadini, the supreme leader of Iran, Ali Khamenei issued a statement of public condolences in respect of him.

See also

References

External links
 Sayyid Rida Baha' al-Dini - WikiShia
 Ethics or akhlāq, Shi'a Books on Ethics
 Book Shining Sun In Memory of ‘Allamah Tabataba’i

1908 births
1997 deaths
Shia clerics
Iranian Shia clerics
Iranian Shia scholars of Islam
People from Qom
Burials at Fatima Masumeh Shrine